Izzat is a 1968 Indian Hindi-language drama film directed by T. Prakash Rao. It stars Dharmendra, Tanuja and Jayalalithaa. It was the former's only Bollywood film as an actress, previously been featured in a Hindi song in Man-Mauji (1962).

Plot
After completing his college, dark-skinned Adivasi Shekhar returns home and finds that his mother, Savli, has passed away. Distraught, he is consoled by Father Abraham, who also tells him that his mother had an affair with wealthy Ramgarh-based Thakur Pratap Singh, who refused to marry her even after she became pregnant. Shekhar decides to avenge his humiliation and sets forth to expose Pratap. Upon arrival in Ramgarh, he finds that he has a fair-skinned look-alike half-brother, Dilip, as well as a sister, Neelu. Dilip meets him, hires him as an office staff person, and asks him to impersonate him in order to meet Deepa, the only daughter of wealthy Vinodbabu, and Shekhar agrees to do so. Shekhar meets Deepa and both are attracted to each other. Shekhar decides to tell her the truth about himself, and returns to Ramgarh. Once there, he finds history repeating itself as Dilip is in love with an Adivasi belle, Jhumki, but is refusing to marry her.

Cast
 Dharmendra as Shekhar / Dilip Singh (Dual Role)
 Tanuja as Deepa
 Jayalalithaa as Jhumki
 Balraj Sahni as Thakur Pratap Singh
 Mehmood as Mahesh
 Laxmi Chhaya as Gangi
 Manmohan Krishna as Father Ibrahim
 Mohan Sherry as Dukal

Production
Izzat was the South Indian actress Jayalalithaa's first and only Hindi film in a full-fledged role, and second Hindi film overall, following a three-minute appearance in Man-Mauji (1962).

Music
The film score is composed by the musical duo Laxmikant Pyarelal. The lyrics were written by Sahir Ludhianvi. Mohammed Rafi was used as Dharmendra's voice and Manna Dey was used as Mehmood's voice.

Reception
The film was  commercially successful,  the onscreen rapport between Dharmendra and Jayalalithaa received much praise.

References

External links
 

1968 films
1960s Hindi-language films
Films directed by T. Prakash Rao